BlacKkKlansman is a 2018 American biographical comedy-drama film directed by Spike Lee and written by Charlie Wachtel, David Rabinowitz, Kevin Willmott, and Lee, based on the 2014 memoir Black Klansman by Ron Stallworth, the first African-American detective in the city's police department who infiltrated and exposed the local chapter of the Ku Klux Klan in the 1970s. Produced by Lee, Raymond Mansfield, Shaun Redick, Sean McKittrick, Jason Blum, and Jordan Peele, the film stars John David Washington as Stallworth, along with Adam Driver, Laura Harrier, and Topher Grace.

BlacKkKlansman premiered on May 14, 2018, at the Cannes Film Festival,  where it won the Grand Prix. It was theatrically released in the United States on August 10, 2018, coinciding with the one-year anniversary of the white supremacist Unite the Right rally.

The film has grossed $88.2 million worldwide, and received acclaim from critics, with critics praising the performances (particularly of Washington and Driver) and timely themes, as well as noting it as a return to form for Lee. At the 76th Golden Globe Awards, it earned four nominations; Best Motion Picture – Drama, Best Director for Lee, Best Actor – Drama for Washington and Best Supporting Actor for Driver. At the 24th Critics' Choice Awards, the film received four nominations for Best Picture, Best Director for Lee, Best Supporting Actor for Driver, and Best Adapted Screenplay. In addition, the American Film Institute selected it as one of the top 10 films of 2018.

Accolades

Notes

See also
 2018 in film

References

External links 
 

Lists of accolades by film